James Gerard Collins (born 16 October 1938) is a former Irish Fianna Fáil politician who served as Minister for Foreign Affairs from March 1982 to December 1982 and 1989 to 1992, Minister for Justice from 1977 to 1981 and 1987 to 1989, Minister for Posts and Telegraphs from 1970 to 1973, Parliamentary Secretary to the Minister for Industry and Commerce and Parliamentary Secretary to the Minister for the Gaeltacht from 1969 to 1970. He was a Member of the European Parliament (MEP) for the Munster constituency from 1994 to 2004. He served as a Teachta Dála (TD) for the Limerick West constituency from 1967 to 1997.

Early life

Collins was born in Abbeyfeale, County Limerick, in 1938. The son of James Collins, his father was a former adjutant of the West Limerick Brigade of the Irish Republican Army during the Irish War of Independence. He took the republican side during the subsequent Civil War. He was elected to Dáil Éireann at the 1948 general election as a Fianna Fáil candidate.

Collins was educated locally at St. Ita's College before later attending the Patrician College, Ballyfin. Following the completion of his secondary schooling, he attended University College Dublin, where he became secretary of the Kevin Barry Cumann of Fianna Fáil. He unsuccessfully ran for Student Union president but was defeated by Brendan Ó Cathaoir. Collins subsequently worked as a vocational school teacher.

Political career

Collins first became involved in politics in 1965, when he was appointed assistant general-secretary of Fianna Fáil. Following the death of his father in 1967, he was elected to Dáil Éireann for Limerick West in the subsequent by-election. He was also co-opted onto Limerick County Council and various other local committees.

Following Fianna Fáil's re-election at the 1969 general election, Collins secured promotion as a Parliamentary Secretary to George Colley, the Minister for Industry and Commerce and the Gaeltacht. Here he largely had responsibility for the promotion of Gaeltacht affairs and the Irish language.

Minister for Posts and Telegraphs (1970–1973)

In the wake of the Arms Crisis in 1970, a major reshuffle of the cabinet took place. Four ministers, Charles Haughey, Neil Blaney, Kevin Boland and Mícheál Ó Móráin, were either sacked, resigned or retired from the government, due to the scandal that was about to take place. Collins was appointed Minister for Posts and Telegraphs. It was a tough time for Fianna Fáil, as the party nearly faced a split due disagreements over its Northern Ireland policy. Collins, in spite of coming from a strong republican background, remained loyal to Taoiseach Jack Lynch in his moderate approach to the Northern Ireland situation.

During his tenure as a Minister, Collins introduced a controversial law which prohibited organisations committed to violence, such as the IRA, from making media broadcasts. On 19 November 1972, an interview with Seán Mac Stíofáin was broadcast on the RTÉ This Week radio programme. Mac Stíofáin was arrested on the same day and the interview was later used as evidence against him on a trial of IRA membership, and on 25 November, he was sentenced to six months imprisonment by the Special Criminal Court in Dublin. Political fallout arising from the interview was considerable and some days later, Collins sacked the entire RTÉ Authority as he felt that they disobeyed the controversial new law.

In 1973, Fianna Fáil were ousted after sixteen years in government, as the National Coalition of Fine Gael and the Labour Party took office. Collins was retained on Jack Lynch's new front bench as Spokesperson for Agriculture. After two years in that position he was promoted to Spokesperson for Justice in a front bench reshuffle in 1975. In this capacity he was highly critical of the government's management of the Garda Síochána.

Minister for Justice (1977–1981)

In defiance of the opinion polls and political commentators Fianna Fáil swept to power with a huge 20-seat Dáil majority following the 1977 general election. Collins, at thirty-eight years of age, was one of the youngest members of Jack Lynch's new cabinet and was appointed Minister for Justice. In spite of the sensitive nature of the portfolio, he was viewed as a safe pair of hands. He had a good working relationship with the Garda Síochána, primarily due to his establishment of the Ryan tribunal, which saw all ranks receive huge pay increases in his first year in office.

In December 1979, Jack Lynch resigned as Taoiseach and as Fianna Fáil leader. The succession resulted in a straight contest between Charles Haughey and George Colley. The latter had the backing of the majority of the existing cabinet, including Collins, however, a backbench revolt saw Haughey become Taoiseach. Collins, much to his disappointment, was retained in his existing position as Minister for Justice, holding office until Fianna Fáil lost power following the 1981 general election.

Minister for Foreign Affairs (1982)

The Fine Gael-Labour government was short-lived and Fianna Fáil returned to power, following the February 1982 general election. Collins was rewarded by being named Minister for Foreign Affairs, in Haughey's second cabinet. One of the major incidents of his tenure at Iveagh House was the outbreak of the Falklands War. Although Anglo-Irish relations were at an all-time low, Collins opposed the act of aggression by the Argentinian government at United Nations and EEC levels.

The Fianna Fáil government fell in October of that same year and Collins's party were out of power following the November 1982 general election. A period of instability followed within Fianna Fáil as a number of TDs attempted to oust Charles Haughey as party leader. Desmond O'Malley was seen as the clear front-runner to succeed Haughey, however, Collins's name was also mentioned alongside former European Commissioner Michael O'Kennedy. In the end, Haughey survived as party leader, after being told at a meeting of the parliamentary party by Collins that Fianna Fáil had lost credibility due to his continued leadership. In spite of this he was subsequently appointed front bench spokesperson on Foreign Affairs on the new front bench.

Minister for Justice/Foreign Affairs (1987–1992)

The results of the 1987 general election saw Fianna Fáil return to power as a minority government. Collins was disappointed to return to his old position as Minister for Justice, preferring instead to take over as Foreign Minister, however, he was once again regarded as a safe pair of hands in a controversial portfolio.

Fianna Fáil retained power following the 1989 general election, albeit with the support of the Progressive Democrats in a coalition government. Collins returned to the cabinet in his preferred position as Minister for Foreign Affairs. January 1990, saw him take over as President of the European Community Council of Ministers during Ireland's six-month tenure. This was largely seen as a very successful presidency for the Irish government and was a personal triumph for Collins.

In 1991, tensions began to surface within Fianna Fáil regarding the continued leadership of Charles Haughey. Minister for Finance Albert Reynolds was the main challenger, however, he had little support from his cabinet colleagues. In an infamous interview on the Six One News Collins made a plea to Reynolds asking him not to challenge Haughey for the leadership of the Fianna Fáil party: "This is going to wreck our party right down the centre and it's going to burst up government". https://www.irishexaminer.com/news/arid-30278425.html The incident was much parodied, particularly by Dermot Morgan later that year. Reynolds's leadership challenge failed on that occasion and Haughey survived.

In February 1992, Haughey stepped down as Taoiseach and Fianna Fáil leader and Reynolds immediately threw his hat in the ring in the leadership contest. Collins contemplated running in the leadership race after a number of approaches from his colleagues, however, in the end he declined to stand. Reynolds won the subsequent leadership election by a large majority. The formation of his new cabinet caused widespread shock as Collins and seven of his cabinet colleagues were effectively sacked in favour of supporters of the new Taoiseach. This effectively brought Collins's domestic career in politics to an end.

Member of the European Parliament (1994–2004)

In 1994, Collins was elected as an MEP for the Munster constituency. He retired from domestic politics at the 1997 general election, being replaced by his brother, Michael J. Collins. Collins was re-elected to the European Parliament in 1999, but lost his bid for another term at the 2004 European Parliament elections. Subsequent to this defeat, he announced his retirement from politics.

References

External links

1938 births
Living people
Ministers for Foreign Affairs (Ireland)
Fianna Fáil TDs
Members of the 18th Dáil
Members of the 19th Dáil
Members of the 20th Dáil
Members of the 21st Dáil
Members of the 22nd Dáil
Members of the 23rd Dáil
Members of the 24th Dáil
Members of the 25th Dáil
Members of the 26th Dáil
Members of the 27th Dáil
Politicians from County Limerick
MEPs for the Republic of Ireland 1999–2004
MEPs for the Republic of Ireland 1994–1999
Fianna Fáil MEPs
Ministers for Justice (Ireland)
Irish schoolteachers
Parliamentary Secretaries of the 19th Dáil